Östra Torn, roughly translated as "Eastern Tower", is an eastern city-district in the Swedish town of Lund.

The Swedish singer Timbuktu was born and raised in Östra Torn.

Lund
Neighbourhoods in Sweden